The Light in the Piazza may refer to:

 The Light in the Piazza (novel), 1960 novella written by Elizabeth Spencer
 Light in the Piazza (film), a 1962 movie starring Olivia de Havilland 
 The Light in the Piazza (musical), a 2003 stage musical.